Al-Sinaat Al-Kahrabaiya Sport Club, is an Iraqi football team based in Baghdad, that plays in the second tier Iraq Division One.

History
Al-Sinaat Al-Kahrabaiya Sport Club was founded on 1 August 2009 by Ministry of Industry and Minerals, and was officially registered in the Ministry of Youth and Sports in 2011. Only six years later they qualified to play in the Iraqi Premier League after winning the 2016–17 Iraq Division One as a runner-up under the leadership of coach Kadhim Yousif. The club played in Iraqi Premier League in 2017–18 season for first time, in first season under coach Emad Aoda they were able to finish in 11th place, ahead of major teams that have been playing for many years in the league.

Current squad

First-team squad

Personnel

Current technical staff

{| class="toccolours"
!bgcolor=silver|Position
!bgcolor=silver|Name
!bgcolor=silver|Nationality
|- bgcolor=#eeeeee
|Manager:||Ali Abdul Jabbar||
|- 
|Assistant manager:||Haidar Sabah||
|- bgcolor=#eeeeee
|Assistant manager:||Vacant||
|-
|Fitness coach:||Vacant||
|- 
|Goalkeeping coach:||Khalid Attiya Risan||
|-bgcolor=#eeeeee
|Administrative director:||Karim Abdul Wahab||
|- bgcolor=#eeeeee
|Club doctor:||Abdul Ameer Dalfi||
|-
|U19 Head coach:||Ammar Ali||
|-

Board members

{| class="toccolours"
!bgcolor=silver|Position
!bgcolor=silver|Name
!bgcolor=silver|Nationality
|-bgcolor=#eeeeee
|President:||Ali Khalaf Jaber||
|-
|Vice-president:||Safaa Sahib||
|-bgcolor=#eeeeee
|Secretary:||Ahmed Saddam||
|-
|Treasurer:||Ali Mohsen||
|-bgcolor=#eeeeee
|Member of the Board:||Sabah Nahi||
|- 
|Member of the Board:||Jamal Jassim||
|- bgcolor=#eeeeee
|Member of the Board:||Adnan Manhal||
|-
|Member of the Board:||Haider Shwayea||
|-bgcolor=#eeeeee
|Member of the Board:||Saif Sami||
|-

Managerial history

  Kadhim Yousif 
  Emad Aoda 
  Abbas Attiya 
  Mudhafar Jabbar 
  Ahmad Abdul-Jabar 
  Adel Nima 
  Emad Aoda 
  Abbas Obeid 
  Haider Obeid 
  Adel Nima 
  Ali Abdul Jabbar 
  Haider Obeid 
  Safaa Adnan 
  Mudhafar Jabbar 
  Mohammed Ali Karim

References

External links
 Team's profile on kooora.com

Sport in Baghdad
Association football clubs established in 2009
2009 establishments in Iraq
Football clubs in Baghdad